The 2022-23 RPI Engineers Men's ice hockey season was the 103rd season of play for the program and the 61st in the ECAC Hockey conference. The Engineers represented Rensselaer Polytechnic Institute, played their home games at Houston Field House and were coached by Dave Smith, in his 5th season.

Season

Departures

Recruiting

Roster
As of August 29, 2022.

Standings

Schedule and results

|-
!colspan=12 style=";" | Exhibition

|-
!colspan=12 ! style=""; | Regular Season

|-
!colspan=12 style=";" |

Scoring statistics

Goaltending statistics

Rankings

Note: USCHO did not release a poll in weeks 1, 13, or 26.

References

2022-23
RPI Engineers
RPI Engineers
RPI Engineers
RPI Engineers